Vaibhavwadi railway station is a station on Konkan Railway. It is at a distance of  down from origin. The preceding station on the line is Vilavade railway station and the next station is Nandgaon Road railway station.

References

Railway stations along Konkan Railway line
Railway stations in Sindhudurg district
Ratnagiri railway division